Joachim Osvold (born 23 September 1994) is a Norwegian football striker who currently plays for Hødd in the Norwegian 2. divisjon.

A son of former Lillestrøm player Kjetil Osvold, he started in Lillestrøm too but also played youth football in Skedsmo and Oppsal. Ahead of the 2011 season he joined Lillestrøm's B team. He made his senior debut in the Norwegian Premier League in May 2012. He left Lillestrøm at the end of 2015 season after his contract was not renewed.

He joined Rot-Weiss Essen in February 2016 after training with the club for two weeks.

In late July he joined Bodø/Glimt and signed a one-year contract with the club.

Career statistics

Club

References

External links

1994 births
Living people
People from Skedsmo
Norwegian footballers
Norwegian expatriate footballers
Eliteserien players
Norwegian First Division players
Norwegian Second Division players
Regionalliga players
Veikkausliiga players
Lillestrøm SK players
Turun Palloseura footballers
Kuopion Palloseura players
Rot-Weiss Essen players
FK Bodø/Glimt players
Levanger FK players
IL Hødd players
Expatriate footballers in Germany
Expatriate footballers in Finland
Association football forwards
Sportspeople from Viken (county)